Frits Barend (born 17 February 1947) is a Dutch journalist, radio presenter and television presenter.

He is known for presenting the late night television talk show Barend & Van Dorp with Henk van Dorp. Barend became nationally known for his talk show Barend & Van Dorp, which he co-hosted with Henk van Dorp. 

In 2007, he was one of the co-founders of the television channel Het Gesprek, together with Ruud Hendriks and Derk Sauer. The channel stopped broadcasting in August 2010 due to financial problems.

Personal life 

Barend is the father of journalist and television presenter Barbara Barend.

References

External links 
 

1947 births
Living people
Dutch radio journalists
Dutch television journalists
Dutch radio presenters
Dutch television presenters